"To Have You Back Again" is a song written by Annie Roboff and Arnie Roman, and recorded by American country music artist Patty Loveless.  It was released in January 1998 as the second single from her album Long Stretch of Lonesome.

The song charted for 20 weeks on the Billboard Hot Country Singles and Tracks chart, reaching number 12 during the week of May 9, 1998.

Chart positions

Year-end charts

References

1998 singles
Patty Loveless songs
Songs written by Annie Roboff
Song recordings produced by Emory Gordy Jr.
Epic Records singles
1997 songs
Songs written by Arnie Roman